Euptera plantroui, or Plantrou's euptera, is a butterfly in the family Nymphalidae. It is found in Liberia and Cameroon. The habitat consists of forests.

References

Butterflies described in 1998
Euptera